Chetwynd  is a district municipality located on the foothills of the Rocky Mountains in northeastern British Columbia, Canada. Situated on an ancient floodplain, it is the first town eastbound travellers encounter after emerging from the Rockies along Highway 97 and acts as the gateway to the Peace River Country. The town developed during the construction of infrastructure through the Rocky Mountains in the 1950s, and was used as a transshipment point during the construction of hydroelectric dams in the 1960s and 1970s and the new town of Tumbler Ridge in the early 1980s. Home to approximately 2,600 residents, the population has increased little if at all since the 1980s but is significantly younger than the provincial average.

Once known as Little Prairie, the community adopted its name in honour of provincial politician Ralph L.T. Chetwynd, just prior to its incorporation in 1962. The  municipality consists of the town, a community forest, and four exclave properties. Chetwynd has dozens of chainsaw carvings displayed throughout town as public art. It is home to a  Northern Lights College campus. Nearby, there are four provincial parks, two lakes, and several recreational trails.

Highways 29 and 97 intersect in town; the east–west Highway 97 connect the town to Prince George and Dawson Creek while the north–south Highway 29 connects Tumbler Ridge and Hudson's Hope. A rail line branches off in three directions: northward to Fort St. John, east to Dawson Creek, and west through the Rockies to Prince George. Its economy is dominated by the primary industries of forestry, fossil fuel extraction, and transportation.

History
From 1918 until the 1930s, the present townsite hosted a trading post on a grassy pasture known to the Sekani and Saulteaux as Little Prairie. In the 1920s, settlers from the Peace River Country began migrating westwards across the frozen Kiskatinaw and Pine Rivers to lands assigned under the Dominion Lands Act for homesteading. Little Prairie was homesteaded in 1930 by Alexander and Lillan Windrem who cleared the land by 1935 for hay, oats and gardens. Oil and coal discoveries, west of Little Prairie, near Commotion Creek, led to the construction of area roads. As the area's natural resource potential became more apparent, a highway was planned in the late 1940s from the British Columbia Interior to the northern side of the Rocky and Omineca Mountains. The John Hart Highway, named after former B.C. Premier John Hart, was completed in 1952; designated Highway 97S it stretches from Prince George to Dawson Creek, with an intersection at Little Prairie. This was northeastern BC's first connection with the rest of the province; previously a trip through the neighboring province of Alberta was required. Following the opening of the highway, businesses such as restaurants and service stations were opened in Little Prairie to accommodate incoming workers and settlers. The first school was built in 1951.

Little Prairie was incorporated as a waterworks district on 8 October 1957; within the span of a few years a rail line, natural gas pipeline, and telephone line were built along the highway from Prince George. Provincial Minister of Railways Ralph L.T. Chetwynd (who also directed the Pacific Great Eastern Railway) headed the rail line project. The rail line continued eastward to Dawson Creek which was the westernmost terminus of Northern Alberta Railways. In early 1958, the first train ceremonially arrived in Little Prairie from Vancouver. Its load included pipe to symbolize natural gas development, steel railway track for the extension of the rail line, box cars for grain and lumber, and a truck representing freight hauling along the Alaska Highway. The railway station in Little Prairie was completed in 1959 and named after Chetwynd, who had died two years earlier. Soon afterwards the post office adopted this name.

Chetwynd became the community's official name on 1 July 1959. In 1960, the Chetwynd Waterworks District expanded its mandate to include garbage disposal, fire protection, and street lighting. Led by its Chamber of Commerce, the community incorporated as a municipality on 25 September 1962. The application for incorporation estimated Chetwynd's population as 750—inclusive of nearby work camps. The 1966 Canadian census, the first to recognize Chetwynd as a census subdivision, counted 1,368 residents.

Growth continued in the 1960s when the town served as the rail-to-truck transshipment point for delivering workers and supplies to the construction site of the W. A. C. Bennett Dam in nearby Hudson's Hope. Canfor and West Fraser Timber bought sawmills in 1964 and 1971, respectively, and eventually became two of the town's largest employers. The development of its forestry sector led to the town being declared the Canadian Forest Service's 1992 Forestry Capital of Canada. The community opened a rodeo ground and curling rink in 1963, a library in 1967, a new fire hall in 1968, an airport in 1970 and a hospital in 1971.

Further growth was stoked in the late 1970s and early 1980s by the construction of the Peace Canyon Dam near the Bennett Dam, the opening of the natural gas and sulfur plant, and the construction of a mining town Tumbler Ridge. Chetwynd thus was re-incorporated as a district in 1983 with a population of 2,957. With no more megaprojects, Chetwynd's population remained relatively stable at about 3,000, with a peak population in 1996 at 3,113.

On 4 December 1996, Chetwynd's boundaries were expanded to include  of forested land and industrial properties. Most of this came from moving the northern border up  over Ol' Baldy Ridge to create a community forest, a concept which originated from a Chetwynd Secondary School proposal in 1980 for a fitness trail. The trail became the backbone of a system of interconnected trails and greenspaces that went up the ridge. Four industrial properties—a gas plant, sulfur processing plant, coal mine, and pulp mill—became exclaves of the district as they incorporated to receive municipal services. The coal mine, with an expected lifespan of 15 years, was approved by the province for development in 1998. It was not constructed until 2004, making it the province's first new coal mine in 20 years. It only operated for 2 years before closing due to poor yields, equipment failure, and lack of financial backing.

Geography and climate
Carved out of an ancient floodplain, the small terrace upon which Chetwynd is situated lies in the northern foothills of the Rocky Mountains. Once used as a grazing spot by nomadic Aboriginals, the terrace was farmed by settlers until it was developed into a town. Two types of soil—namely, the Widmark and Centurion Series—comprise the terrace's surface. The Widmark Series—a moderately well-drained degraded loamy, woody, silty, and clay-like soil—lies north of Highway 97. Meanwhile, the Centurion Series—which lies south of the highway—is a poorly drained soil with a dark-brown peaty surface material consisting of decomposed leaves and mosses. These soils, also limited by topography and stoniness, are generally used for forage and pasture.

The town is surrounded by forested hills but the prairies of the Peace River Country begin here and continue eastward into Alberta. It lies in a transition area dividing two biogeoclimatic regions: the Boreal White and Black Spruce zone and the Engelmann Spruce-Subalpine Fir zone. The regions surrounding Chetwynd and Dawson Creek contain Reindeer herds, although the total number of caribou have decreased in the first two decades of the twenty-first century. One factor of the caribou's decline is the large number of wolves who prey on the caribou; in 2014 the British Columbian government began a wolf-culling program to reduce the number of wolves in the region. The region also contains moose, whose numbers have increased due to improved habitats caused by cutting down trees for the logging industry. The area surrounding Chetwynd was affected by a pine beetle infestation, which caused timber mills to reduce their operations in the region.

The town experiences a cool continental climate, including frigid winters and warm summers. Chetwynd, like the rest of the Peace River Regional District, uses Mountain Standard Time year-round. The remainder of the province uses Pacific Standard Time with daylight saving time, meaning that Chetwynd shares the same time with the province during the summer and is one hour ahead during the winter.

Demographics

According to the 2016 Canadian census, Chetwynd had a median age 10.4 years lower than the province's. English is the mother tongue of nearly all residents of Chetwynd with a small population of native Tagalog speakers. The largest immigrant group comes from the Philippines, representing  of all immigrants to the municipality.

Residents of Chetwynd are less educated than the provincial average.

Ethnicity 
The primary ethnic groups in Chetwynd were reported as: Canadian, Scottish, English, German, Irish, First Nations, French, and Metis.

Religion 
According to the 2021 census, religious groups in Chetwynd included:
Irreligion (1,445 persons or 63.5 percent)
Christianity (795 persons or 34.9 percent)
Buddhism (15 persons or 0.7 percent)

Economy
Chetwynd is the commercial centre for the rural communities of the Pine River Valley, as well as Moberly Lake, Jackfish Lake, and Lone Prairie. These rural residents are mostly cattle, sheep, and bison ranchers and use the town as a transportation hub to ship products via highways or rail. After the town was connected by rail and highway to the remainder of the province, the town's economy expanded, between 1950 and 1980, to include primary industries, including lumber mills (West Fraser Mills, Canadian Forest Industries, Tembec Pulp Mill), gas plants (Duke Energy, Talisman Energy), a coal processing plant (Pine Valley Mining), and a sulfur processing plant (Enersul). Since the late 1990s, Chetwynd has undergone an economic downturn from the closure of coal mines in Tumbler Ridge and the softwood lumber trade dispute between Canada and the United States, which led to the closure of the Louisiana-Pacific Canada Pulp Company pulp operations in 2001. The 2001 census recorded 1,120 income-earners over the age of 15 residing in Chetwynd; of these, 690 worked full-time throughout the year. Since then, the economy has rebounded with increased oil, gas and mineral exploration, tourist marketing of the area's outdoor recreational activities and chainsaw carvings program, new and re-opened coal mines, and wind farm construction. Both the Dokie Ridge Wind Farm and Meikle Wind Farm were constructed. In 2015, Paper Excellence bought the Tembec Mill, which had been idle since 2012, and invested $50 million in upgrades. The mill opened in May 2015 only to undergo a maintenance shutdown in September of that year.

Education

The 2001 census estimated that 10% of people in Chetwynd between 20 and 64 years old graduated from a university, less than half of the 24% provincial average and 26% did not graduate from secondary school, 6% higher than the provincial average. Chetwynd's schools are administered by School District 59 Peace River South, which operates one secondary school and three primary schools: Chetwynd Secondary School, Don Titus Elementary, Windrem Elementary, and Little Prairie Elementary. Northern Lights College maintains a campus in Chetwynd, which has a 2003 enrollment of 170 students (based on full-time equivalents). It was established in 1976 with eight general interest and two university transfer courses.

Infrastructure

The John Hart Highway portion of Highway 97 runs east–west through Chetwynd, connecting the town to Dawson Creek ( east) and Prince George ( south). Highway 29 (Don Philips Way) runs north–south through Chetwynd, connecting the town to Hudson's Hope ( north) and Tumbler Ridge ( southeast). The downtown core lies just west of the intersection of Highway 97 and Highway 29. Chetwynd's internal street network has  of paved road, which uses the highway as its main arterial road with parallel frontage roads for local trips. A site plan by the province in 1957 laid out the basic structure of the town.

Chetwynd has rail, air, and bus service for regional and provincial transportation needs. Rail lines enter Chetwynd from three directions: from Fort St. John in the north, from Dawson Creek in the east, and from Prince George in the south. Pacific Great Eastern Railway (later BC Rail) ran passenger service to Chetwynd until 1990. Since then the trains have been used solely for moving resources such as lumber and coal. The District of Chetwynd has operated the unmanned Chetwynd Municipal Airport  since 1970. The runway was paved in 1975 but only handles chartered flights and helicopters. A new airport terminal was  constructed in 2008 by students at Northern Lights College. The closest airports with commercial airlines are at Fort St. John and Dawson Creek. Until 2018 Greyhound Bus Lines maintained a bus stop in town on their Vancouver-Prince George-Dawson Creek route.

The District uses the northeast-flowing Pine River as both a source of drinking water and an outlet for sewage. The former comes from an intake pipe southwest of town. Raw sewage is processed by a five-cell lagoon system and released into the Pine River south of town. The water supply was briefly shut off in 2000 when oil pipeline along the Pine River ruptured, spilling  of oil into the river. Electricity is supplied by BC Hydro from the Bennett and Peace Canyon Dams and natural gas by Pacific Northern Gas. In 2019, the federal and provincial governments announced a joint project to increase electricity supply to the Peace Region.

Culture and recreation
The Little Prairie Heritage Museum, located in one of the town's oldest buildings (a converted post office dating to 1949) displays artifacts and re-creations of the town's frontier times, and nostalgia pieces from the construction of infrastructure through the Rocky Mountains. A public art program, started in 1987, showcases over 50 chainsaw carvings spread throughout town with a downtown monument that declares Chetwynd the "Chainsaw Sculpture Capital of the World". The town's first annual chainsaw carving contest was held in June 2005. A regular contestant in the Communities in Bloom contest, the District built four wind turbines in 2004 to power decorative lights on 25 large trees along its boulevard as an entry to the WinterLights Celebration contest. The statue has been periodically altered by replacing the ax with other accessories, such as a lasso, rifle, gold pan and pitchfork, or dressed in other outfits, like a Santa suit.
 

For outdoor recreation, a community forest on Mount Baldy provides residents with trails for walking, hiking, cycling, and cross-country skiing close to home. Nearby provincial parks include Gwillim Lake Provincial Park ( southeast), Moberly Lake Provincial Park ( northwest), Pine River Breaks Provincial Park ( east), and East Pine Provincial Park ( east). Chetwynd has an indoor rodeo facility, an outdoor speed skating oval, and a general recreation complex which has within it an ice arena, swimming pool and curling rink, among other facilities.

Media
Since the 1970s, the Chetwynd Communications Society has worked to establish radio and television service. For many years, they rebroadcast pre-recorded content to Chetwynd and surrounding communities via a telecommunications tower on nearby Wabi Mountain. On 5 December 1996, 94.5 CHET-FM—the town's first radio station—went on-air. Since then the station has expanded with a repeater tower in Dawson Creek at 104.1 and is now known collectively as Peace FM. Its programming uses a series of specialty programs such as metal, gospel, hard rock, and dance. Chetwynd's community television station, CHET-TV channel 55, began broadcasting on 8 March 2000, in a ceremony attended by Governor General Adrienne Clarkson. The Chetwynd Communications Society also owns a series of low-powered repeaters that rebroadcasts selected Canadian and American stations via satellite. In addition, Chetwynd is served by CBUZ-FM 93.5, repeating CBC Radio One station CBYG-FM from Prince George.

Two periodicals covered local news: the weekly newspaper Chetwynd Echo and the biweekly newsletter Coffee Talk Express. The Chetwynd Echo was created by the Chamber of Commerce in 1959 as The Chinook in a tabloid format. It was renamed the Weekly Advertiser in 1962 and the Chetwynd Echo in 1971 when it switched to a broadsheet format. The Chetwynd Echo closed in 2016, publishing its final edition on 6 January.

Government and politics 

The District of Chetwynd's council-manager form of municipal government is headed by a mayor (who also represents Chetwynd on the Peace River Regional District's governing board) and a six-member council. These positions, plus two school board trustees, are subject to at-large elections every three years. Mayor Allen Courtoreille was first elected in 2018. He was preceded by Merlin Nichol (2011–2018) and Evan Saugstad (2003–2011), and long-time mayor Charlie Lasser. The city funds a volunteer fire department, which services the town and nearby rural communities. It also maintains the sewer, water, local road, sidewalk, street lighting, animal control, building inspection, park, and recreation services. The city also partially funds a ten officer Royal Canadian Mounted Police detachment, which covers the municipality and nearby rural communities.

The Province staffs a government agent office in Chetwynd for access to licenses, permits, and government programs. Through the Northern Health Authority the province operates the five-bed Chetwynd General Hospital. As part of the Peace River South provincial electoral district, it is represented in the Legislative Assembly of British Columbia by BC Liberal Mike Bernier, first elected in the 2013 provincial election. Before Bernier, Peace River South was represented by Blair Lekstrom between 2001 and 2013, and by Jack Weisgerber, between 1986 and 2001, of the Social Credit Party of British Columbia (1986–1994) and Reform Party of British Columbia (1994–2001). In 1996 as leader of the Reform Party, Weisgerber won re-election despite placing second in the Chetwynd polls to the BC Liberal Party candidate.

Chetwynd is located in the Prince George—Peace River riding which sends a Member of Parliament to the federal House of Commons of Canada. The town has been represented by Conservative Party member Bob Zimmer since the May 2011 federal election. Prior to Zimmer, the town was represented by Jay Hill, also of the Conservative Party, from 1993 to 2010. Before Hill, the riding was represented by former Chetwynd mayor Frank Oberle of the Progressive Conservative Party. Oberle was elected Chetwynd's mayor in 1968, its MP in 1972, and was appointed to be Canada's Minister of Science and Technology in 1985 and its Minister of Forestry in 1989 during the 33rd Canadian Parliament.

Freedom of the District honour

The following have received the Freedom of the District honour from Chetwynd.

Individuals
 Yvonne Elden: 2007

References

External links

Designated places in British Columbia
District municipalities in British Columbia
Populated places in the Peace River Regional District